The Turkish Riviera, also known popularly as the Turquoise Coast, is an area of southwest Turkey encompassing the provinces of Antalya and Muğla, and to a lesser extent Aydın, southern İzmir and western Mersin.

Among the archaeological points of interest are two of the Seven Wonders of the Ancient World: The ruins of the Mausoleum of Maussollos in Halicarnassus; and the Temple of Artemis in Ephesus.

The Turkish Riviera is also the home of the internationally known Blue Voyage (a.k.a. Carian Cruise), which allows participants to take a week-long trip aboard the local gulet schooners to ancient cities, harbors, tombs, mausolea, and beaches in the small coves, forests, and streams that are on the Turquoise Coast.

The coastline is regarded as a cultural trove that provides background on a fascinating mixture of factual and mythological individuals, conflicts and events, and has frequently been referred to in the folklore of various cultures throughout history. As such, it is regarded as the home of scholars, saints, warriors, kings, and heroes, as well as the site of numerous well-known myths. Mark Antony of the Roman Republic is said to have picked the Turkish Riviera as the most beautiful wedding gift for his beloved Cleopatra of Egypt. Saint Nicholas, who later became the basis of the Santa Claus legend, was born in Patara, a small town close to present-day Demre. Herodotus, regarded as the "father of History", was born in Bodrum (ancient Halicarnassus) in c. 484 BC. The volcanic mountains to the west of Antalya, near Dalyan, are believed to have been the inspiration for the mythical Chimera — the fire-breathing monster that Bellerophon slew.

Communities and settlements
Many cities, towns and villages in the area are internationally known, such as Alanya, Antalya, Belek, Bodrum, Çeşme, Didim, Fethiye, Kalkan, Kaş, Kemer, Kuşadası, Marmaris, and Side.

Notable places on the Turkish Riviera include:

 Akbük
 Akyaka
 Alaçatı
 Alanya
 Antalya
 Armutalan
 Beldibi
 Belek
 Beycik
 Bitez
 Bodrum
 Bozburun

 Çamyuva
 Çeşme
 Çıralı
 Dalaman
 Dalyan
 Datça
 Demre
 Didim
 Fethiye
 Finike
 Gazipaşa
 Göcek

 Gökova
 Gümüşlük
 Güzelçamlı
 Hisarönü
 Ilıca
 İçmeler
 Kalkan
 Kaş
 Kekova
 Kemer
 Kızkumu
 Kumluca

 Kuşadası
 Konyaaltı
 Köyceğiz
 Lara
 Manavgat
 Marmaris
 Milas
 Muğla
 Olympos
 Ortaca
 Ovacık
 Ölüdeniz

 Ören
 Özdere
 Patara
 Selimiye
 Side
 Simena
 Torba
 Turgutreis
 Turunç
 Türkbükü
 Ulupınar
 Yalıkavak

Gallery

See also
 The Blue Voyage
 Marinas in Turkey
 Tourism in Turkey
 Foreign purchases of real estate in Turkey
 Riviera (disambiguation)

Notes

 
Coasts of Turkey
Seaside resorts in Turkey
Landforms of Antalya Province
Landforms of Muğla Province
Landforms of Aydın Province
Landforms of İzmir Province